Same-sex marriage in Virginia has been legal since October 6, 2014, following the decision of the U.S. Supreme Court not to hear an appeal of the Fourth Circuit Court of Appeals' ruling in Bostic v. Schaefer. Same-sex marriages subsequently began at 1:00 p.m. on October 6 after the Fourth Circuit issued its mandate, and since then Virginia has performed legal marriages of same-sex couples and recognized out-of-state same-sex marriages. Previously, the state had passed a statute prohibiting same-sex marriage in 1975, and further restrictions were added in 1997 and 2004, which made "void and unenforceable" any arrangements between same-sex couples bestowing the "privileges or obligations of marriage". Voters approved an amendment to the Constitution of Virginia reinforcing the existing laws in 2006. On January 14, 2014, a U.S. district court judge ruled in Bostic that Virginia's statutory and constitutional ban on the state recognition of same-sex marriages were unconstitutional, a decision upheld by the Fourth Circuit on July 28, 2014.

The Virginia General Assembly repealed the statute ban on same-sex marriages in 2020. In 2022, the Republican-controlled House of Delegates rejected a proposed constitutional amendment to repeal the constitutional ban, despite popular public support. A 2021 poll conducted by the Public Religion Research Institute showed that 71% of Virginians supported same-sex marriage. Same-sex marriage is supported by both of the state's senators, Democrats Mark Warner and Tim Kaine.

Legal history

Statutes
In August 1975, the Code of Virginia was amended to prohibit marriages between persons of the same sex. On February 4, 1997, the Virginia State Senate, by a 37–3 vote, approved a bill banning the recognition of same-sex marriages from other jurisdictions and "any contractual rights created by such marriage". On February 19, the Virginia House of Delegates, by an 81–8 vote, approved the bill, and on March 15, Governor George Allen signed the legislation into law, which took effect on July 1. On March 10, 2004, the Senate voted 28–10 for a bill prohibiting civil unions or similar arrangements between members of the same sex, including arrangements created by private contract. On March 11, the House of Delegates approved the bill 77–21. Governor Mark Warner issued a formal recommendation to the General Assembly to remove the provisions prohibiting partnership contracts. The House of Delegates received the Warner's recommendations on April 15. On April 21, it rejected the recommendations by a vote of 35–65 and by a 69–30 vote approved the bill prohibiting civil unions. That same day, the Senate approved the bill 27–12. It became law without Governor Warner's signature and went into effect on July 1.

On February 3, 2015, following the legalization of same-sex marriage in Virginia, the Senate voted in favor of a bill to update Virginia's statutory laws by making all references to marriage gender-neutral. The bill was sponsored by Senator Adam Ebbin and enjoyed bipartisan support. The bill died in a House subcommittee, however. In January 2016, Senator Ebbin introduced a similar bill, which later died without a vote. Representative Marcus Simon introduced a similar bill to the House in January 2018, and an companion bill was introduced to the Senate by Ebbin. None of them passed into law.

On January 28, 2020, the House of Delegates approved a bill (HB 1490) repealing provisions of the Code of Virginia that banned same-sex marriage and civil unions, in a 63–34 vote. On February 17, the bill passed the Senate by 28 votes to 12. It was signed into law by Governor Ralph Northam on March 3. An identical measure (SB 17) passed the Senate on January 21 in 25–13 vote, and the House on February 19 in a 62–38 vote. It was signed into law by Governor Northam on March 6. Both measures took effect on July 1, 2020.

On January 24, 2023, the Virginia Senate passed a bill 25–12 affirming the right of same-sex couples to marry. The legislation would add the following statement to state law, "A marriage between two parties shall be lawful regardless of the sex of such persons, provided that such marriage is not otherwise prohibited by the provisions of this title. Religious organizations and members of the clergy acting in their religious capacity shall have the right to refuse to perform any marriage."

Constitutional amendments
On February 26, 2005, the House of Delegates voted 79–17 in favor of a constitutional amendment, known as the Marshall-Newman Amendment, that would ban same-sex marriage and any "legal status for relationships of unmarried individuals that intends to approximate the design, qualities, significance, or effects of marriage". That same day, the Virginia Senate voted 30–10 in favor of the amendment. An amendment to the Constitution of Virginia requires approval by two succeeding elected legislatures. As such, on January 13, 2006, the House of Delegates voted 73–22 in favor of the amendment, and on February 17 the Senate voted 29–11 in favor. On November 7, 2006, Virginia voters approved the constitutional amendment, which took effect on January 1, 2007.

On February 4, 2021, the Virginia House of Delegates voted 60–33 in favor of a constitutional amendment to repeal the Marshall-Newman Amendment, now unenforceable and void, and replace it with language affirming the fundamental right to marry, regardless of gender. The amendment would also guarantee protections for religious clergy and their right to refuse to perform marriages that would contradict their beliefs. On February 19, 2021, the Virginia Senate voted 22–12 in favor of the amendment. The amendment needed to be approved by the subsequent legislature before being placed on the ballot for approval by the Virginia electorate. However, the Republican Party took control of the House during the 2021 elections, and in February 2022 a House subcommittee voted 6–4 against the amendment, despite popular public support. A 2021 poll from the Public Religion Research Institute showed that 71% of Virginians supported same-sex marriage, and most analysts expected the measure to pass conformably had it been placed on the ballot. Chris Head, the chairman of the subcommittee that blocked the amendment, said the measure might have passed had it been a "clean" repeal bill that did not seek to replace the ban with affirmative language declaring marriage a right. Representative Mark Sickles responded, "When you're on the wrong side of public opinion you can really make up some stories".

In July 2022, Governor Glenn Youngkin told a national television audience on Face the Nation that "in Virginia, we actually do protect same-sex marriage". Representative Abigail Spanberger tweeted, "The Governor either doesn't know Virginia's constitution or he's lying & assuming we won't notice.", and Senator Ebbin issued the following statement, "Either [Youngkin] is ignorant of the status of gay marriage in Virginia or chose to lie." PolitiFact described Youngkin's statement as "mostly false" and "disingenuous". A.E. Dick Howard, a professor at the University of Virginia School of Law, said that "[i]f Obergefell were to be overturned, then, in Virginia, the marriage amendment would take precedence over any conflicting provision of state law. Same-sex marriages would not be recognized in Virginia."

Democratic lawmakers announced in November 2022 that they would introduce another constitutional amendment to repeal the Marshall–Newman Amendment. Republican Delegate Tim Anderson introduced a resolution to repeal the ban in late November. Anderson, who had voted against repealing the same-sex marriage ban in the past, said, "Fundamentally, it does not change anything about Virginia law, because the U.S. Supreme Court has already declared this provision of our constitution unconstitutional. So, nothing is going to fundamentally change in Virginia, it's just mostly about removing dead language in our Constitution. […] I think you'll see most of the people that think like me in the General Assembly, the conservatives, that had a concern with the Democrat language last year, are going to support this clean version of just a straight repeal." The earliest the proposal could be placed on the ballot for approval by voters was in 2024. A separate amendment was introduced by Senator Ebbin in January 2023, and passed the Senate on February 2 by a vote of 25–14. It was rejected by a Republican-controlled House committee by a 4–1 vote on February 17, despite an overwhelming majority of Virginians supporting same-sex marriage.

Federal lawsuits

Bostic v. Schaefer

On July 18, 2013, two gay men filed a lawsuit, Bostic v. McDonnell, in the U.S. District Court for the Eastern District of Virginia challenging the state's ban on same-sex marriage. A lesbian couple, who had married in California and were the parents of a teenager, joined the case as plaintiffs. The suit named Governor Bob McDonnell as the principal defendant. After McDonnell left office in January 2014, the case was restyled as Bostic v. Rainey, with Janet Rainey, the State Registrar of Vital Records, as the lead defendant. In January 2014, Attorney General Mark Herring and Governor Terry McAuliffe announced their support for the suit, and said they would not defend the state ban. On February 3, 2014, the House of Delegates voted 65–32 in favor of a bill giving the Virginia General Assembly the right to defend a provision of the Virginia Constitution that is contested or constitutionality questioned if the Governor or Attorney General choose not to defend the law, but the State Senate Committee on Rules voted 12–4 in favor of it being passed by indefinitely in rules on February 21, which effectively killed the bill for that legislative session. Judge Arenda Wright Allen heard oral arguments on February 4, 2014, with attorneys for the Norfolk Clerk of Circuit Court, George Schaefer, defending the state's ban on same-sex marriage.

On February 13, 2014, Judge Wright Allen ruled that Virginia's statutory and constitutional ban on same-sex marriage violated the U.S. Constitution. Citing Loving v. Virginia, she held that marriage is a fundamental right, that a limitation on the right to marry is therefore subject to strict scrutiny, meaning that "compelling state interests" are required to justify it. She found that Virginia's arguments in support of its ban on same-sex marriage failed to meet that standard of review, and that they did not even pass rational basis review, the least demanding judicial standard. She stayed enforcement of her ruling pending appeal as the state had requested. Wright Allen wrote in her ruling:

The Fourth Circuit Court of Appeals heard arguments on appeal on May 13, with the case now styled Bostic v. Schaefer. On July 28, a three-judge panel of the Fourth Circuit, composed of Judges Roger Gregory, Paul V. Niemeyer, and Henry F. Floyd, ruled 2–1 in favor of striking down Virginia's ban on same-sex marriage. The court found that same-sex couples have a fundamental right to marry:

The defendants had at least 21 days (i.e. by August 21, 2014) to request a stay, or file for rehearing or rehearing en banc. Michèle McQuigg, the Prince William County Clerk of Circuit Court, an intervenor defendant in Bostic, sought a stay of the Fourth Circuit's decision, which was denied by the court on August 13, 2014, with Judges Floyd and Gregory opposing the motion and Judge Niemeyer supporting. McQuigg then petitioned for a writ of certiorari with the U.S. Supreme Court. Chief Justice John Roberts, as Circuit Justice for the Fourth Circuit, referred the matter to the full court, which stayed enforcement of the ruling on August 20. On October 6, the U.S. Supreme Court rejected Virginia's appeal in brief, allowing the Fourth Circuit to immediately lift the stay of the ruling. Same-sex couples began marrying in Virginia from 1 p.m. on October 6, 2014. The first same-sex couple to marry in Virginia were Lindsey Oliver and Nicole Pries in Richmond. Dawn Turton and Beth Trent were the first couple to be issued a marriage license in Alexandria. Governor McAuliffe issued the following statement, "This is a historic and long overdue moment for our Commonwealth and our country. On issues ranging from recognizing same-sex marriage to extending health-care benefits to same-sex spouses of state employees, Virginia is already well-prepared to implement this historic decision. Going forward we will act quickly to continue to bring all of our policies and practices into compliance so that we can give marriages between same-sex partners the full faith and credit they deserve. [..] Equality for all men and women regardless of their race, color, creed or sexual orientation is intrinsic to the values that make us Virginians, and now it is officially inscribed in our laws as well." Chad Griffin, president of the Human Rights Campaign, said, "Any time same-sex couples are extended, marriage equality is something to celebrate. Today is a joyous day for thousands of couples across America who will [almost] immediately feel the impact of today's Supreme Court action. But ... the complex and discriminatory patchwork of marriage laws that was prolonged today by the Supreme Court is unsustainable. The only acceptable solution is nationwide marriage equality." House Speaker William J. Howell said he was "disappointed", and Representative Bob Marshall, one of the authors of the 2006 constitutional same-sex marriage ban, stated, "Make no mistake. Once natural marriage is abolished, marriage will soon include polygamy, or threesomes, leaving innocent children to suffer the consequences and other far-reaching consequences of attempting to force legal acceptance of so-called same sex marriage." The Supreme Court also denied certiorari petitions in cases from Indiana, Wisconsin, Oklahoma and Utah that same day, legalizing same-sex marriage in those states.

Harris v. Rainey
On August 1, 2013, two lesbian couples, one of whom had married in the District of Columbia in 2011, filed a lawsuit, Harris v. McDonnell, in the U.S. District Court for the Western District of Virginia. They were represented by Lambda Legal and the American Civil Liberties Union (ACLU) and challenged both the state's denial of marriage rights to same-sex couples and its refusal to recognize same-sex marriages from other jurisdictions. They asked the court to recognize their suit as a class action on behalf of all same-sex couples in Virginia who sought to marry or had married elsewhere. On December 23, Judge Michael F. Urbanski removed Governor McAuliffe as a defendant, leaving the State Registrar of Vital Records, Janet Rainey, and the Staunton clerk who denied a license to one of the couples. On January 31, the judge certified the case as a class action, now restyled as Harris v. Rainey. On March 31, Judge Urbanski ordered Harris stayed until the Fourth Circuit issued a decision in Bostic. The Fourth Circuit allowed the parties in Harris to intervene in the Bostic appeal and file briefs, and on July 28, 2014 ruled against Virginia's same-sex marriage ban. On October 29, the plaintiffs asked the district court to enter judgment in their favor, while the defendants filed motions to dismiss the case as moot in light of Bostic and the legalization of same-sex marriage in Virginia. On February 18, 2015, the plaintiffs reached a settlement with the defendants, and were awarded $60,000 in attorneys' fees. The parties both agreed to a dismissal of the Harris case, and Judge Urbanski subsequently dismissed it.

Luttrell v. Cucco
On April 28, 2016, the Supreme Court of Virginia ruled that cohabitation laws also apply to same-sex couples. In Luttrell v. Cucco, the court ruled that Michael Luttrell no longer had to pay alimony to his ex-wife Samantha Cucco because she was living with a female partner. Under state law, alimony payments can be stopped if the payee remarries or has been "habitually cohabitating with another person in a relationship analogous to a marriage" for at least a year. The Supreme Court overturned a decision of the Virginia Court of Appeals that Luttrell had to continue paying alimony because a cohabitation was "understood to apply only to relationships between a man and a woman". "The court made the correct ruling in this case, which is to recognize that all laws regarding marriage must be applied equally regardless of the gender of the individuals involved. Marriage equality means marriage equality.", said the ACLU in a press release.

Native American nations
Virginia is home to several Native American tribes, of which seven are federally recognized: the Pamunkey Indian Tribe, the Chickahominy Indian Tribe, the Chickahominy Indian Tribe Eastern Division, the Upper Mattaponi Indian Tribe, the Rappahannock Tribe, the Nansemond Indian Nation, and the Monacan Indian Nation. The federal court ruling does not apply to these tribes, which have jurisdiction over the marriages and divorces of tribal members, though members may still request a marriage license from their county clerk. It is unclear if same-sex marriage is legal on their reservations as tribal officials have not publicly commented on the issue. It is possible that the Tutelo people traditionally allowed for marriages between two biological males through a two-spirit status, but a lot of traditional knowledge was lost in the aftermath of colonization, and so it is unknown if such two-spirit individuals were historically allowed to marry.

Demographics and marriage statistics

Data from the 2000 U.S. census showed that 13,802 same-sex couples were living in Virginia. By 2005, this had increased to 19,673 couples, likely attributed to same-sex couples' growing willingness to disclose their partnerships on government surveys. Same-sex couples lived in all counties and independent cities of the state and constituted 0.9% of coupled households and 0.5% of all households in the state. Most couples lived in Fairfax County, Arlington County and Alexandria. Same-sex partners in Virginia were on average younger than opposite-sex partners, and significantly more likely to be employed. In addition, the average and median household incomes of same-sex couples were higher than different-sex couples, but same-sex couples were far less likely to own a home than opposite-sex partners. 20% of same-sex couples in Virginia were raising children under the age of 18, with an estimated 6,503 children living in households headed by same-sex couples in 2005.

In the approximately 10-month period subsequent to same-sex marriage becoming legal in Virginia (October 6, 2014 to August 31, 2015), a total of 3,598 marriage licenses were issued to same-sex couples, representing 5.27% of all licenses issued in the state in that time. The three most popular localities for same-sex marriages were Norfolk, Virginia Beach and Richmond.

Between 2014 and 2018, same-sex couples made up 11,360 of the 300,865 marriages performed in Virginia, or about 3.8%. Virginia Beach registered the most same-sex marriages of any locality with 1,155, followed by Norfolk at 849 and Richmond at 564. The localities which saw the most same-sex marriages in comparison to heterosexual marriages were Buena Vista (where same-sex marriages accounted for 7.0% of all unions), Norfolk (6.9%), Charlottesville (6.8%), Roanoke (6.7%) and Richmond (6.3%). Conversely, Highland County, Bland County and Manassas Park registered no same-sex marriages at all.

Public opinion
A May 2011 poll for The Washington Post found that 47% of Virginians favored the legalization of same-sex marriage, while 43% opposed it and 10% had no opinion. It also found that 55% favored allowing same-sex couples to adopt children, while 35% opposed and 10% had no opinion. The same poll found that 64% of residents from Fairfax County, Arlington County, Alexandria and Fairfax supported same-sex marriage; 63% of residents from the counties of Loudoun, Prince William, Stafford, Fauquier, Culpeper, Madison, Rappahannock, Clarke and Frederick, as well as the cities of Manassas, Manassas Park and Winchester supported same-sex marriage, while only 42% of the rest of Virginia did so.

A July 2011 Public Policy Polling (PPP) survey found that 35% of Virginia voters thought same-sex marriage should be legal, while 52% thought it should be illegal and 14% were not sure. A separate question on the same survey found that 65% of Virginia voters supported the legal recognition of same-sex couples, with 32% supporting same-sex marriage, 33% supporting civil unions but not marriage, 33% favoring no legal recognition and 2% being unsure. A December 2011 survey conducted by the same polling organization found that 34% of Virginia voters thought same-sex marriage should be legal, while 53% thought it should be illegal and 13% were not sure. A separate question on the same survey found that 59% of Virginia voters supported the legal recognition of same-sex couples, with 31% supporting same-sex marriage, 28% supporting civil unions but not marriage, 38% favoring no legal recognition and 3% being undecided. A May 2012 PPP survey found that 41% of Virginia voters thought same-sex marriage should be legal, while 50% thought it should be illegal and 9% were not sure. When civil unions were considered, 65% of voters favored some form of legal recognition for same-sex couples.

A June 2012 poll for The Washington Post found that 49% of Virginians favored the legalization of same-sex marriage, while 40% opposed it and 11% had no opinion. Another poll for The Washington Post, conducted between April and May 2013, found that 56% of registered voters thought same-sex marriage should be legal, while 33% thought it should be illegal, and 10% had no opinion. A Greenberg Quinlan Rosner Research and TargetPoint Consulting poll conducted in June 2013 found that 55% of Virginians supported same-sex marriage. Among respondents below the age of 30, support was at 71%.

A July 2013 Quinnipiac University poll found that 50% of Virginians supported same-sex marriage, while 43% opposed it. In an August 2013 Emerson College poll, 38% of Virginians supported same-sex marriage, while 48% opposed it and 14% were undecided. A September 2013 Marist College poll found that 55% of Virginia residents supported same-sex marriage, while 37% opposed it, and an October 2013 poll by Christopher Newport University found that 56% of likely voters opposed the ban on same-sex marriage, compared to 36% who favored it.

A December 2013 Public Religion Research Institute (PRRI) survey found that 52% of Virginia residents supported same-sex marriage, while 42% opposed and 6% did not know or refused to answer. A March 2014 Quinnipiac University poll found that 50% of Virginians supported same-sex marriage, while 42% opposed it. A 2015 PRRI survey showed that 49% of Virginia residents supported same-sex marriage. In 2016, the PRRI placed support at 57%, and in 2017 at 60%, with 32% opposed and 8% unsure or undecided.

A PRRI survey conducted between January 7 and December 20, 2020 on 1,555 random telephone interviewees showed that 69% of respondents supported same-sex marriage, while 32% were opposed. A survey conducted by the same polling organization between March 8 and November 9, 2021 showed that 71% of respondents supported same-sex marriage, while 26% opposed and 3% were undecided.

See also

 LGBT rights in Virginia
 Same-sex marriage in the United States
 Loving v. Virginia

References

LGBT in Virginia
Virginia
2014 in LGBT history
2014 in Virginia